Air Vice-Marshal RAUP Rajapaksa RSP and two Bars, USP (also known as Udeni Rajapaksa) is an air officer of the Sri Lanka Air Force who is incumbent Chief of Staff of the Sri Lanka Air Force. Prior to that, he served as Director of Operation at Sri Lanka Air Force headquarters.

Early life and education 
Rajapaksa completed his higher school from Bandaranayake College, Gampaha and Ananda College, Colombo. He joined Sri Lankan Air Force an Officer Cadet on 6 October 1988 in the 6th Officer Cadets’ Intake. He was commissioned as a pilot officer in the GDP Branch in 1990 from Kotelawala Defence Academy. He also completed his graduation from the Air Command and Staff College, Air University, Alabama, USA and then from the prestigious Royal College of Defence Studies (rcds), UK in International Security and Strategic Leadership Studies.

Career 
Rajapaksa was appointed as Director, Air Operations at Air Force Headquarters from 18 March 2022 to September 2022. He also commanded SLAF Academy, China Bay as the Commandant in 2020. Before that, he served as Air Secretary from 2016. Then, he was Commander of SLAF Base Katunayake. On 1 April 2020 he promoted to Air Vice Marshal from Air Commodore and became Chief of Staff of the Sri Lanka Air Force on September, 2022.

Personal life 
Udeni is married to Mrs. Inoka Kamani Alwis and the couple is blessed with a daughter and a son.

References 

Living people
Sri Lanka Air Force air vice-marshals
Sinhalese military personnel
Alumni of General Sir John Kotelawala Defence University
1969 births